Paul A. Gompers is an American economist. He is the Eugene Holman Professor of Business Administration at the Harvard Business School. He is the co-author of three books.

Early life
Paul A. Gompers grew up in St. Louis, Missouri. He graduated with a bachelor's degree in biology from Harvard University in 1987. He earned a Marshall Scholarship to attend the University of Oxford, where he earned an MSc in economics. He earned a PhD in business economics from Harvard University in 1993.

Career
Gompers worked as a biochemist for Bayer shortly after college. After his PhD, he was an Assistant Professor of Finance at the University of Chicago's Booth School of Business. He joined the Harvard Business School, where he eventually became the Eugene Holman Professor of Business Administration. He now teaches executive education at the HBS. He has written between 50 and 60 business cases. He has also published articles in The Journal of Finance, the Journal of Financial Economics, the Brookings Papers on Economic Activity, The Journal of Private Equity, the Quarterly Journal of Economics, The Journal of Law and Economics, etc. Additionally, he is the co-author of three books, two of which were co-authored with his HBS colleague Josh Lerner and the third one with his HBS colleague William A. Sahlman.

Gompers serves on the board of directors of Spur Capital Partners, a private equity firm. He is also a senior advisor to Cornerstone Research, a litigation consulting firm. He is also a research associate at the National Bureau of Economic Research.

Works

References

Living people
Harvard College alumni
Marshall Scholars
Alumni of the University of Oxford
University of Chicago Booth School of Business faculty
Harvard Business School faculty
20th-century American economists
21st-century American economists
American corporate directors
Year of birth missing (living people)
Harvard Graduate School of Arts and Sciences alumni